Standard Kannada grammar is primarily based on Keshiraja's Shabdamanidarpana (c. 1260 CE) which provides the fullest systematic exposition of Kannada language. The earlier grammatical works include portions of Kavirajamarga (a treatise on alańkāra) of 9th century, Kavyavalokana and Karnatakabhashabhushana both authored by Nagavarma II in first half of the 12th century.

Various grammatical aspects of Kannada include, tatsama–tadbhava, vibhakti pratyaya, kāla (tense-forms), linga (gender-forms), sandhi, samāsa, chandassu, alańkāra; and different poetrical metres such as vritta, tripadi, kanda (also called, choupadi or chaturpadi), shatpadi, sāngatya and others.

The name given for a pure, true letter is akshara, akkara or varna. Each letter has its own form (ākāra) and sound (shabda); providing the visible and audible representations, respectively. Kannada is written from left to right.
Kannada alphabet (aksharamale or varnamale) now consists of 49 letters. 

Each sound has its own distinct letter, and therefore every word is pronounced exactly as it is spelt; so the ear is a sufficient guide. After the exact sounds of the letters have been once gained, every word can be pronounced with perfect accuracy. The accent falls on the first syllable.

The first treatise on Kannada grammar in English was written in 1864 by Rev. Thomas Hodson, a Wesleyan missionary, as An Elementary Grammar of the Kannada, or Canarese Language

Nouns (ನಾಮಪದ)

Gender (ಲಿಂಗ) 
According to Keshiraja's Shabdamanidarpana, there are nine gender forms in Kannada. However, in modern Kannada literature only three gender forms are used in practice: masculine, feminine, and neuter.
All Kannada nouns code for gender.
Biological sex tends to correspond with the grammatical gender category. However, certain concepts personified by deities, such as sūrya, meaning 'the sun', share the grammatical gender of the deity, which in this case is masculine.

masculine gender (ಪುಲ್ಲಿಂಗ)
Examples: arasa ('king'), dore ('master, lord'), vāyu ('wind')

feminine gender (ಸ್ತ್ರೀಲಿಂಗ)
Examples: Parvati, Lakshmi, Saraswati, amma ('mother')

neuter gender (ನಪುಂಸಕಲಿಂಗ)
Nouns that do not belong to either of the above two classes are considered to have neuter gender.
Examples: love, world, tree, bear, river

Cases (ವಿಭಕ್ತಿಗಳು) 
Kannada has eight cases:

nominative case	(ಕರ್ತೃವಿಭಕ್ತಿ – kartr̥vibhakti)
accusative case	(ಕರ್ಮವಿಭಕ್ತಿ – karmavibhakti)
instrumental case	(ಕರಣವಿಭಕ್ತಿ – karaṇavibhakti)
dative case	(ಸಂಪ್ರದಾನವಿಭಕ್ತಿ – sampradānavibhakti)
ablative case      (ಅಪಾದಾನವಿಭಕ್ತಿ – apādānavibhakti)
genitive case	(ಸಂಬಂಧವಿಭಕ್ತಿ – saṃbandhavibhakti)
locative case	(ಅಧಿಕರಣವಿಭಕ್ತಿ – adhikaraṇavibhakti)
vocative case	(ಸಂಬೋಧನಾವಿಭಕ್ತಿ – saṃbōdhanāvibhakti)
Because the traditional study of Kannada grammar is based on Sanskrit grammar, a fifth case (since the dative case is the fourth case and the genitive case is the sixth in the traditional order of the cases) is sometimes considered: the ablative case	(ಅಪಾದಾನವಿಭಕ್ತಿ). This case is formed periphrastically by combining the genitive case of the noun supposedly in the ablative with the instrumental-case form of the noun 'ದೆಸೆ', meaning 'cause, vicinity, place, point'. Thus the Kannada ablative literally translates to 'from/by the cause/point of the {noun}'. However, this 'ablative' form is not commonly used colloquially, and exists only for propriety—it is not a true case, serving only to provide a parallel to the Sanskrit ablative. In its place, the third case, the instrumental-ablative case, is normally used.

Example: Maradiṃda allige hōdenu. (literally: 'From the tree to there I went.'; idiomatically: 'I went there from the tree.')

Of course, Marada deseyiṃda allige hōdenu. would also be correct.
Note that the nominative-case and accusative-case forms of a noun are often in the colloquial dialect substituted by the crude base.

Number (ವಚನ) 

There are, as in English, two grammatical numbers: the singular number (ಏಕವಚನ) and the plural number (ಬಹುವಚನ). In declension, the plural form of a masculine or feminine noun is made by suffixing 'ಅರ್' to the crude base, and then the case-termination, and the plural form of a neuter noun is made by suffixing 'ಗಳ್' to the crude base, and then the case-termination. However, nouns of relationship, such as 'mother', 'great-grandfather', 'son-in-law', and 'younger brother', which are always masculine or feminine, have the plural number marker "ಅಂದಿರ್'.

Examples:

 ತಾಯಿಯಂದಿರು
 ಅಕ್ಕಂದಿರು
 ತಮ್ಮಂದಿರು
 ತಾತಂದಿರು

Declension (ವಿಭಕ್ತಿ ಪರಿಣಾಮ) 

Kannada has four declensions, or groups of case-terminations. The first declension includes all masculine and feminine nouns that end in 'ಅ'; the second declension includes all neuter nouns that end in 'ಅ'; the third declension includes all nouns of all genders that end in 'ಇ', 'ಈ', 'ಎ', 'ಏ', or 'ಐ'; the fourth declension includes all nouns of all genders that end in 'ಉ', ಊ', 'ಋ', 'ೠ', 'ಓ', or 'ಔ'.
Below are the 'standard' case-terminations, which are suffixed to the plural number markers to create the full case-termination in the plural. However, in the singular number, all the declensions use variations of the 'standard' case-terminations as the final case-terminations.

Declensional sandhi (ವಿಭಕ್ತಿಪರಿಣಾಮದ ಸಂಧಿ) 

Sandhi is the mutation of the final or initial letters of a word for euphony. Sandhi occurs very often in declension.

In the first declension and in the second declension, the only sandhi that occurs is the elision (dropping) of the final 'ಅ' ('atva') before a plural marker or case-termination that begins with a vowel.

In the third declension, a euphonic 'ಯ್' ('yatva') must be inserted after the noun before a plural marker or case-termination that begins with a vowel.

In the fourth declension, a euphonic 'ವ್' ('vatva') must be inserted after the noun before a plural marker or case-termination that begins with a vowel. However, when a Kannada noun ends in a 'ಉ' that was already added for euphony at some original stage, that final vowel is eliminated when the noun is followed by a plural marker or case-termination that begins with a vowel. For example, the Kannada word for ‘table’ is ‘ಮೇಜು', from the Persian ‘mez’. In transference, the
final ‘z’ of ‘mez’ became a ‘j’, since Kannada has no letter to represent the ‘z’ sound. However, ‘ಮೇಜ್’ does not sound good in Kannada—so a euphonic ‘ಉ’ was added to the crude base of the word. However, because technically the true base has no final vowel (although the base still takes the fourth declension endings), that euphonic ‘ಉ’ of ‘ಮೇಜು’ is elided during declension. These words that already have a euphonic 'ಉ' that is elided during declension attached to their end must be learned, but most native Kannada, or originally Kannada, words have this 'euphonic "ಉ" ' on their end, because not many Kannada words originally ended in 'ಉ'.

First declension (ನಾಮಪ್ರತ್ಯಯಗಳ ಮೊದಲನೇ ವರ್ಗ)

Second declension (ನಾಮಪ್ರತ್ಯಯಗಳ ಎರಡನೇ ವರ್ಗ)

Third declension (ನಾಮಪ್ರತ್ಯಯಗಳ ಮೂರನೇ ವರ್ಗ)

Fourth declension (ನಾಮಪ್ರತ್ಯಯಗಳ ನಾಲ್ಕನೇ ವರ್ಗ) 

Note that for the instrumental case, the genitive case, and the locative case, the case-termination first given is generally preferred.

Modifiers (ಪರಿವರ್ತಕಗಳು) 

Kannada, as does English, uses adjectives and adverbs as modifiers. Kannada does not have articles. However, the adjectives 'ಆ' ('that') and 'ಒಂದು' ('one') can be used as the definite and the indefinite article, respectively.

Kannada possess few adjectives that are not derived from some noun. Adjectivalizing suffixes include 'ಆದ' (literally: 'which/that became') and 'ಇಕ'.

Kannada lacks true predicate adjectives. To use an adjective predicatively, suffix the third-person pronoun to the end of the adjective that matches the subject.

Adverbs are formed by the suffix 'ಆಗಿ'. Adverbs can be added to adjectives or to nouns, unlike in English, where '-ly' can only be suffixed to adjectives.
Example: sundaravāgi ('beautifully', from 'sundara' ["beauty"] + 'ಆಗಿ')

Verbs (ಕ್ರಿಯಾಪದಗಳು)

Sandhi with verb inflection (ಕ್ರಿಯಾಪದಗಳ ರೂಪನಿಷ್ಪತ್ತಿಯ ಸಂಧಿ) 

Sandhi is the mutation of the final or initial letters of a word for euphony. Sandhi with verbs applies in any case when the form of a verb is being changed.

When any verb form (ಕ್ರಿಯಾರೂಪ) ends with the vowel 'ಅ' ('atva') or with the vowel 'ಉ' ('utva'), eliminate that final vowel if a suffix that begins with a vowel follows.

	ಬರು (crude verb form; 'come') → ಬರ್  + ಅಲಿ (third person singular imperative suffix) = ಬರಲಿ

When the crude form/root of the verb (ಕ್ರಿಯಾಪಕೃತಿ) ends with the vowel 'ಇ' ('itva') or with the vowel 'ಎ' ('etva') or with the vowel 'ಆ' ('ātva'), insert a euphonic 'ಯ್' ('yatva') after the form if a suffix that begins with a vowel follows.

ಬರೆ (bare) (crude verb form; 'write') → ಬರೆಯ್  (barey)+ ಅಲ್  (-al) (infinitive form suffix) + ಪಟ್ಟಿತು (paṭṭitu) (past passive third person singular neuter suffix) = ಬರೆಯಲ್ಪಟ್ಟಿತು (bareyalpaṭṭitu)(past passive third person neuter form of 'ಬರೆ'; 'it was written')

When any other form of the verb ends with the vowel 'ಇ' ('itva') or with the vowel 'ಎ' ('etva'), eliminate that final vowel if a suffix that begins with a vowel follows. No other verb form other than the crude form/root of a verb will end in 'ಆ'.

ಮಾಡು (crude verb form; 'make') → ಮಾಡಿ (past adverbial participle; 'having made') + ಇತು (past active third person singular imperative suffix) = ಮಾಡಿತು

Finite verb forms (ಆಖ್ಯಾತರೂಪಗಳು) 

Kannada verbs have several forms: aJ (ನಿಶ್ಚಯರೂಪ), a
contingent-future, or potential, form (ಸಂಭಾವರೂಪ),
an imperative form (ವಿಧಿರೂಪ),
and a negative form (ನಿಷೇಧರೂಪ).
The action of a verb in the affirmative form does happen, but the action
of a verb in the negative form does not happen. The contingent-future form
expresses the idea of the possibility of an action's occurrence at the present
or in the future; the imperative form commands, exhorts, or optates.

As in English, the three tenses (ಕಾಲಗಳು)
include the present tense (ವರ್ತಮಾನಕಾಲ),
the past tense (ಭೂತಕಾಲ),
and the future tense (ಭವಿಷ್ಯತ್ತುಕಾಲ).
However, distinct forms for each of these tenses exist only in the
affirmative form. The imperative form, as in English, lacks tense, and because
of the meaning of the contingent-future form, it also lacks tense distinctions.
The negative form is peculiar, for its forms can possess a present-tense,
past-tense, or future-tense meaning, to be inferred from context; in the modern
dialect, other modes of negation are employed.

There are two grammatical aspects (ಸ್ಥಿತಿಗಳು)
of verbs—the perfect aspect (ಪೂರ್ಣವಾಚಕ
ಸ್ಥಿತಿ), in which the action has already occurred at the time expressed
by the tense of the verb, and the progressive aspect (ಗತಿಸೂಚಕ ಸ್ಥಿತಿ), in which the
action is ongoing at the time expressed by the tense of the verb.

The expression of voice (ಪ್ರಯೋಗ)
in Kannada is quite different than in English, but the same two voices
exist in both languages—the active voice (ಕರ್ತರೀ ಪ್ರಯೋಗ) and the passive voice (ಕರ್ಮಣಿ ಪ್ರಯೋಗ).

Finite Kannada verbs are conjugated for all these properties as well as
three properties of the subject: person (ಪುರುಷ),
number (ವಚನ), and
gender (ಲಿಂಗ). There
are three persons in Kannada as in English—the first person (ಉತ್ತಮ ಪುರುಷ), the second person
(ಮಧ್ಯಮ ಪುರುಷ),
and the third person (ಪ್ರಥಮ
ಪುರುಷ)—as well as a singular number (ಏಕವಚನ) and a plural number (ಬಹುವಚನ). Whether a noun is of
the masculine gender (ಪುಲ್ಲಿಂಗ),
of the feminine gender (ಸ್ತ್ರೀಲಿಂಗ),
or of the neuter gender (ನಪುಂಸಕಲಿಂಗ)
is decided semantically. All nouns denoting male entities, including
entities personified—for example, religiously—as male entities, are masculine,
and all feminine nouns denote female entities or femalely personified entities;
the remaining nouns fall into the neuter gender.

Non-finite verb forms (ಕ್ರಿಯಾಪದಗಳ ಅವ್ಯಯರೂಪಗಳು) 

The first non-finite verb form is the infinitive form (ಭಾವರೂಪ). There are three infinitives, which vary in their uses and their endings.
Other than the infinitive, Kannada has two types of participle—an adjectival participle (ಕೃದ್ವಾಚಿ) and an adverbial participle (ಕ್ರಿಯಾನ್ಯೂನ). While the present participle of English can function both adjectivally and adverbially, and the past participle can function only adjectivally, Kannada participles’ functions are quite consistent.
The Kannada adjectival participle is peculiar, for it takes the place of the relative pronoun that introduces a restrictive relative clause, the verb of the relative clause, and if the relative pronoun is a prepositional complement, of the governing preposition. There is a present-future adjectival participle, as well as a past adjectival participle.
The adverbial participle has a present-tense form and a past-tense form, and modifies the verb of the sentence. The adverbial participle may accept its own nominative, as may the adjectival participle in its clause.
Kannada does not have a gerund, but nouns that express the same idea can be formed by suffixing the third-person neuter pronoun to the present adjectival participle.

Inflecting verbs for non-finite forms (ಕ್ರಿಯಾಪದಗಳ ಅವ್ಯಯರೂಪಗಳಿಗೆ ರೂಪನಿಷ್ಪತ್ತಿ)

Present adverbial participle (ವರ್ತಮಾನಕಾಲದ ಕ್ರಿಯಾನ್ಯೂನ) 

To form the present adverbial participle of a verb, add the suffix 'ಉತ್ತ' to the crude form of the verb. There are no exceptions in the modern dialect, but occasionally the forms 'ಉತ' or 'ಉತ್ತಾ' may appear.

Past adverbial participle (ಭೂತಕಾಲದ ಕ್ರಿಯಾನ್ಯೂನ) 

To form the past adverbial participle of a verb that ends in “ಉ,” (-u) add the suffix “ಇ” (-i) to the crude form of the verb. To form the past adverbial participle of a verb that ends in any vowel but “ಉ,” (-u) add the suffix “ದು” (-du) to the crude form of the verb.

There are many oddly formed past adverbial participles, some of them irregular, and some of them following old formations, and others changed for euphony. They are listed below:	

For these verbs, or any modern forms of them:	
 ಕವಲು
 ಮಡಲು
 ಬಲಿ
 ಕಲಿ
 ಹೋಲು
 ಸಾಲು
 ಸೋಲು
 ಹೇಲು
 ನೂಲು
 ಕೂರಿ
 ಕೊನರು
 ತಳಿರು
 ಚಿಗುರು
 ಬೆವರು
 ಅಳು
 ಉಳು
 ಕೀಳು
 ಚಳಿ
 ಮೊಳೆ
 ಅರಿ
 ಕುರಿ
 ಬಾ
 ಕೀ
suffix “ತು.”

Certain
final consonants
are replaced with other consonants before the “ದು” or the “ತು”
of the past participle. Before 'ದು': 
ಲ್ →
ದ್; ಳ್ →
ದ್. Before
“ತು”: ಱ್ →
ತ್; 
ಱು
(in which the
final “ಉ”
was originally euphonic, as with the euphonic “ಉ”
for nouns) →
ತ್

The
following verbs’ past participles can be formed regularly, but there is also
another, irregular form of those verbs: ಆಗು
→ ಆಯ್; ಪೋಗು
→ ಪೋಯ್; 
ಹೋಗು
→ ಹೋಯ್

Present-future adjectival participle (ವರ್ತಮಾನಕಾಲದ ಮತ್ತು ಭವಿಷ್ಯತ್ತುಕಾಲದ ಕೃದ್ವಾಚಿ) 

To form the present-future adjectival participle, add the suffix “ಉವ” (-uva) to the crude form of the verb. There are not irregulars for this form in the modern dialect.

Past adjectival participle (ಭೂತಕಾಲದ ಕೃದ್ವಾಚಿ) 

The past adjectival participle of the verb is formed from the past adverbial participle. If the past adverbial participle of a verb ends in 'ಉ' (-u), add 'ಅ' (-a) to the end of the past adverbial participle to form the past adjectival participle. If the past adverbial participle of a verb ends in 'ಇ' (-i), add 'ದ' (-da) to the end of the past adverbial participle.

Irregular past adjectival participles include: 'ಆದ' (āda), from crude verb root 'ಆಗು' (āgu, to be/become); 'ಪೋದ' (pōda), from crude verb root 'ಪೋಗು' (pōgu, to go); and 'ಹೋದ' (hōda), from crude verb root 'ಹೋಗು' (hōgu, to go).

Inflecting verbs for finite forms / Conjugation (ಕ್ರಿಯಾಪದಗಳ ಆಖ್ಯಾತರೂಪಗಳಿಗೆ ರೂಪನಿಷ್ಪತ್ತಿ / ಆಖ್ಯಾತಮಾರ್ಗ)

Affirmative form (ನಿಶ್ಚಯರೂಪ) 

To conjugate verbs in their present-tense affirmative form, attach the following suffixes to the present adverbial participle.

To conjugate verbs in their past-tense affirmative form, attach the following suffixes to the past adjectival participle, except for the third person neuter singular suffix, which is attached to the past adverbial participle.

To conjugate verbs in their future-tense affirmative form, attach the following suffixes to the present-future adjectival participle.

Negative form (ನಿಷೇಧರೂಪ) 

The negative form of the verb does not have any tense. Tense must be told from context. However, more commonly used to negate a verb is the negative word 'ಇಲ್ಲ'.

Suffix these terminations (which are the same as the future tense's suffixes) to the verbal infinitive that ends in "ಅ" for the tenseless negative form:

The negative form has only the irregular formation that 'ಇಲ್ಲ' may be alternatively used in place of the regular negative forms of 'ಇರು'.

Contingent-future form (ಸಂಭಾವರೂಪ/ಸಂಭಾವನಾರೂಪ) 

The contingent-future form expresses the idea that the action of a verb may perhaps occur in the future. For example, 'ಮಾಡಿಯೇನು', which is conjugated in the contingent-future form, may be translated as 'I might do (it)'.

These are the suffixes for the contingent-future form, suffixed to the past adverbial participle for verbs ending in 'ಉ' or the past adjectival participle for verbs ending in 'ಎ' or 'ಇ':

The contingent-future form does not have irregular formations.

Imperative form (ವಿಧಿರೂಪ) 

The imperative form of the verb optates, exhorts, or commands. For example, the first-person and the third-person imperative expresses the idea of 'may/let {I/we/he/she/it/they} ___'. However, the second-person imperative either is used either to command ('Do something!') or with an optative or jussive sense ('may you ___'), depending on the verb's meaning and the context.

These suffixes are attached to the root of the verb:

Below are the irregular imperative forms:
 second-person plural imperative 'ಇರಿ', from crude verb root 'ಇರು'
 second-person singular imperative 'ಕೋ', from crude verb root 'ಕೊಳ್ಳು'
 second-person singular imperative 'ಬೋ', from crude verb root 'ಬೋಲು'
 second-person plural imperative 'ತರಿ', from crude verb root 'ತರು'
 second-person singular imperative 'ತಾ', from crude verb root 'ತರು'
 second-person plural imperative 'ಬನ್ನಿ' or 'ಬನ್ನಿರಿ', from crude verb root 'ಬರು'
 second-person singular imperative 'ಬಾ', from crude verb root 'ಬರು'

A Summary of All Verb Forms (ಎಲ್ಲ ಕ್ರಿಯಾಪದ ರೂಪಗಳ ಸಾರಾಂಶ) 
Below is a table that shows how a verb ending in 'ಉ' conjugates and how a verb ending in 'ಎ' or 'ಇ' conjugates with the verbs 'ಮಾಡು' (to do) and 'ಕರೆ' (to call) respectively. It also shows the conjugation of the irregular verb 'ಇರು' (to be/exist) which is also used as an auxiliary verb.

Word order (ಪದವಿನ್ಯಾಸ) 

Kannada word order is 'S-O-V', or 'subject-object-verb', as opposed to English, which is a 'S-V-O', or 'subject-verb-object' language. However, in Kannada, due to its highly inflected nature, a sentence's word order may be freely changed for style or emphasis.

Sentence constituents (ವಾಕ್ಯದ ಭಾಗಗಳು) 

Kannada sentences have two basic parts: the subject and the predicate. The subject consists of the central topic of the sentence, declined to the nominative case, while the predicate consists of a verb, often with an object (which formally should be in the accusative case), or may have no verb and object at all but rather simply have another noun declined in the nominative case, known as the predicate nominative, where an equivalency statement is intended.

Example: ನಾನು (subject) ಮೇಜನ್ನು (object) ಕಟ್ಟಿದೆನು (verb). ('I built the table.' Here, the subject is 'I' and 'built the table' is the predicate, with 'built' as the verb and 'the table' as the object.

Example: ನಾನು (subject) ಕನ್ನಡದ ವಿದ್ಯಾರ್ಥಿಯು (predicate nominative). ('I (am) a student of Kannada.' Note that there is no direct Kannada equivalent for the verb 'to be' as a copula [linking verb], because Kannada is a zero-copula language, although the sentence may be alternatively written 'ನಾನು ಕನ್ನಡದ ವಿದ್ಯಾರ್ಥಿ(ಯನ್ನು) ಆಗಿದ್ಧೇನೆ.' literally meaning 'I am/exist having become a student of Kannada.'

Subject (ಕರ್ತೃ) 

In Kannada, the subject is declined to the nominative case. While the subject almost always performs the action in Kannada (use of the passive voice is highly rare), the subject may actually be the patient.

In a sentence with a subject, verb, and object, if the subject has already been made clear or is known from context, the subject may be omitted, with the predicate standing alone to make the sentence.

Example: ಮನೆಗೆ ಹೋಗುವೆನು. ('I will go home.' Here, we can omit the subject 'ನಾನು', meaning 'I' because it is clear by the termination of the verb (a first-person singular termination, the same person and number of 'I') that the subject is 'I'.

Example:  ವಿನಯನು ಇವತ್ತು ವಶಾಲೆಗೆ ಹೋಗಲಿಲ್ಲ. ಮನೆಗೆ ಬಂದನು. ('Vinay did not go to school today. {Vinay/he} came home.' In the second sentence, the subject 'Vinay' is omitted because it is clear from the previous sentence that the subject is 'Vinay'.)

Verb (ಕ್ರಿಯಾಪದ) 

In Kannada, there cannot be more than one finite, or conjugated, verb in the sentence. For example, the sentence 'I went to school and came home.' cannot be literally translated into Kannada. The Kannada equivalent of that sentence would be 'Having gone to school, I came home.' In Kannada, adverbial participles must be used.

Example: ನಾನು ವಿದ್ಯಾಲಯಕ್ಕೆ ಹೋಗಿ ಮನೆಗೆ ಬಂದೆನು. ('I, having gone to school, came home.' / 'I went to school and came home.')

Example: ನಾನು ಓಡಿ ಆಡುವೆನು. ('I, having run, will play.' / 'I will run and play.' Note that if the intention is to say that the two actions will happen simultaneously ('I will play as I run.') then the sentence would be written 'ನಾನು ಓಡುತ್ತ ಆಡುವೆನು.')

Object (ಕರ್ಮ)

Dative construction (ಸಂಪ್ರದಾನಪದ ಕಾರ್ತೃವಾಗಿರುವ ವಾಕ್ಯ) 

In Kannada, the dative construction is used often. The dative construction occurs when the semantic subject is in the dative case and semantic direct object is in the nominative case. For example, in Kannada, one does not say 'I feel cold'; rather, one says the equivalent of 'cold is happening to me' ('ನನಗೆ ಚಳಿಯು ಆಗುತ್ತ ಇದೆ'). Similarly, one says 'dinner is wanted to me' ('ನನಗೆ ಉಟವು ಬೇಕು' or 'ನನಗೆ ಊಟವು ಬೇಕಾಗಿದೆ'; the latter literally is broken apart 'ನನಗೆ ಊಟವು ಬೇಕಾಗಿ ಇದೆ', literally meaning 'to me, dinner has become wanted/needed').

Yet another example is the use with 'ಇಷ್ಟ'. For example, one says 'ನನಗೆ ಸೇಬುಗಳು ಇಷ್ಟ ಆಗುತ್ತವೆ' (idiomatically--'I like apples'; literally--'to me, apples become pleasure').

Dative constructions are used to make the equivalent of English sensory linking verbs and with many modal auxiliary verbs. For example, 'I see him' is translated as 'he causes me to see (him)', with 'me' in the dative case.

Interrogation (ಪ್ರಶ್ನಿಸುವುದು)

Negation (ನಿಷೇಧ)

Negative words (ನಿಷೇಧಾರ್ಥಕ ಪದಗಳು) 

Kannada does not have any semantically negative words such as 'never', 'no one', and 'nothing'. These words are expressed by negating the verb with the positive equivalent of the negative word. For example, in Kannada, one cannot say 'students never go to school on Sundays'; one must say the equivalent of 'students do not go to school on Sundays ever' ('ವಿದ್ಯಾರ್ಥಿಗಳು ಯಾವಾಗಾದರೂ ವಿದ್ಯಾಲಯಕ್ಕೆ ಭಾನವಾರಗಳ ಮೇಲೆ ಹೋಗುವದಿಲ್ಲ'). Similarly, for 'no one goes to school on Sundays', one says 'anyone does not go to school on Sundays' ('ಯರೂ ವಿದ್ಯಲಯಕ್ಕೆ ಭಾನವಾರಗಳ ಮೇಲೆ ಹೋಗುವದಿಲ್ಲ').

Example: 'ಎಲ್ಲೂ ಆ ಘೋಷಣೆಯನ್ನು ಜನರು ಅಂಗೀಕರಿಸಲಿಕ್ಕಿಲ್ಲ.' ('Nowhere will the people accept that declaration.')

Negative finite verbs (ನಿಷೇಧಾರ್ಥಕ ಆಖ್ಯಾತಗಳು) 

Although there is a negative 'mood' or form of the verb in Kannada, it is not used commonly anymore. In addition, the negative form does not express time distinctions, so analytic negative forms are employed.

There is no negative adverb like 'not' in Kannada. Analytic verb negation is very peculiar, and it employs a form of 'ಇರು' ('to be, exist'), which is 'ಇಲ್ಲ'. However, negative Kannada verbs with 'ಇಲ್ಲ' do not have personal terminations—they do not indicate the person, gender, or number of the subject.

To form a past negative verb with 'ಇಲ್ಲ', suffix 'ಇಲ್ಲ' to the infinitive form of the verb ending in 'ಅಲ್'. To form a present negative verb with 'ಇಲ್ಲ', suffix 'ಇಲ್ಲ' to the verbal noun of the verb. To form a future negative verb, either use the present-tense negative form of the verb with 'ಇಲ್ಲ' or suffix 'ಇಲ್ಲ' to the infinitive form of the verb ending in 'ಅಲಿಕ್ಕೆ'.

Aspect is expressed by 'ಇಲ್ಲ' in the normal way—by using a negative form of 'ಇರು' with an adverbial participle. For example, 'I will not have been being hit' is 'ಹೊಡಿಯಲ್ಪಡುತ್ತ ಇದ್ದು ಇರಲಿಕ್ಕಿಲ್ಲ'.

Example: 'ಹೋಗುತ್ತ ಇರುವದಿಲ್ಲ.' ('I am not going.')

Example: 'ಹೋಗಿ ಇರಲಿಲ್ಲ.' ('I had not gone.')

However, in the present tense, one can directly use 'ಇಲ್ಲ' after the participle to express aspect.

Example: 'ಹೋಗುತ್ತ ಇಲ್ಲ.' ('I am not going.')

Example: 'ಹೋಗಿ ಇಲ್ಲ.' ('I have not gone.')

Negation of adverbial participles (ಕ್ರಿಯಾನ್ಯೂನಗಳ ನಿಷೇಧ) 

Adverbial participles have a negative form, created by suffix 'ಅದೆ' to the crude form of the verb. This form is tenseless, and is best translated as 'without ___ing'. For example 'ನೋಡಿ ಹೋದೆನು' means 'I went having seen (it)', 'ನೋಡುತ್ತ ಹೋದೆನು' means 'seeing (it), I went' or 'I went seeing (it)', and 'ನೋಡದೆ ಹೋದೆನು' means 'I went not seeing (it)', "I went not having seen (it)', or 'I went without seeing (it)'.

However, 'ಇಲ್ಲ', derived from 'ಇರು' has an adverbial participle form – 'ಇಲ್ಲದೆ' – and this can be used to keep tense when the adverbial participle must be negated. For example, one can say 'ನೋಡಿ ಇಲ್ಲದೆ' to definitively mean 'not having seen, and 'ನೋಡುತ್ತ ಇಲ್ಲದೆ' to definitively mean 'not seeing'.

References 

 
Dravidian grammars

de:Kannada#Grammatik